The McClatchy Company, commonly referred to as simply McClatchy, is an American publishing company incorporated under Delaware's General Corporation Law and based in Sacramento, California. It operates 29 daily newspapers in fourteen states and has an average weekday circulation of 1.6 million and Sunday circulation of 2.4 million. In 2006, it purchased Knight Ridder, which at the time was the second-largest newspaper company in the United States (Gannett was, and remains, the largest). In addition to its daily newspapers, McClatchy also operates several websites and community papers, as well as a news agency, McClatchy DC Bureau, focused on political news from Washington, D.C.

In February 2020, McClatchy filed for Chapter 11 bankruptcy protection. In August 2020, a bankruptcy court approved a bid by hedge fund Chatham Asset Management to acquire McClatchy.

History
The company originated with The Daily Bee, first published in Sacramento, California, on February 3, 1857, by Native American writer Rollin Ridge. James McClatchy joined Ridge as a partner and took over as editor. Known as a supporter of the people's interests against corporations and corrupt politicians, McClatchy made The Bee a bastion of progressive reformism. Upon McClatchy's death in 1883, the paper's leadership passed to James' son, Charles Kenny McClatchy, who with his brother Valentine Stuart, bought out the Ridge family's interests. The two modernized the paper with the formation of McClatchy Newspapers through the founding of the Fresno Bee in 1922 and acquisition of the Modesto Bee in 1924. C.K. McClatchy's legacy to the region has been memorialized in the C.K. McClatchy High School in Sacramento, which opened in 1937, about a year after his death. 

For most of its history, the company was focused on the newspaper business in California's Sacramento Valley and San Joaquin Valley. In 1978, the 4th generation Charles K. McClatchy took over the company and guided the media company toward the modern publicly owned The McClatchy Company through further acquisitions of out-of-state newspapers, Anchorage Daily News in Anchorage, Alaska, and the Tri-City Herald in Kennewick, Washington.

McClatchy also acquired then-ABC affiliate KOVR from Metromedia in 1965. The company's own Modesto Bee reported the sale of the station. It was sold to The Outlet Company in 1978 and today exists as a CBS owned-and-operated station.

In 1990, McClatchy acquired three dailies in South Carolina: The Herald in Rock Hill, The Island Packet in Hilton Head, and The Beaufort Gazette of Beaufort. In 1995, it acquired The News & Observer of Raleigh, North Carolina, and in 1998, it bought the Star Tribune of Minneapolis.

In January 2004, McClatchy bought the Merced Sun-Star of Merced, and five affiliated non-dailies in California's San Joaquin Valley.

The company's biggest acquisition occurred on June 27, 2006, when McClatchy purchased Knight Ridder. Because McClatchy was so much smaller than Knight Ridder at the time, one observer equated the deal as "a dolphin swallowing a small whale." The purchase price of $40 and 0.5118 shares of McClatchy Class A stock per share was valued in total at about $4 billion in cash and stock. The company also assumed $2 billion in debt. This purchase added 20 newspapers to the company stable and the immediate sale (over the next five weeks) of 12 publications including the St. Paul Pioneer Press, San Jose Mercury News and The Philadelphia Inquirer. Those sales were completed on August 2, 2006.  This acquisition would be cited as the major cause of McClatchy's later troubles - McClatchy overpaid for Knight Ridder by buying at the "top of the market", and the immense debt taken on to fuel the purchase would be a millstone around the neck of the combined company.  Additionally, McClatchy did not keep on any of Knight Ridder's digital division or corporate staff, despite the growing prominence of the Internet and Knight Ridder having a well-respected effort in the space at the time.

The Minneapolis-St. Paul Star Tribune, acquired in 1998 and sold in 2007 to the private-equity firm Avista Capital Partners for $555 million, had the highest circulation of all McClatchy newspapers.

The company also owns a portfolio of digital assets, including 15.0% of CareerBuilder, LLC, which operates CareerBuilder.com; 25.6% of Classified Ventures, LLC, a company that offers classified websites, such as the auto website Cars.com; and 33.3% of HomeFinder, LLC, which operates the online real estate website HomeFinder.com. McClatchy also owns 49.5% of the voting stock and 70.6% of the nonvoting stock of The Seattle Times Company.

In January 2017, former Yahoo! and EarthLink executive Craig Forman was appointed as its new president and chief executive officer (CEO). Forman, a private investor and McClatchy board member, succeeded Patrick Talamantes, who was CEO the previous four years.

The descendants of C.K. McClatchy still own a controlling interest in the McClatchy Company and are represented by the 6th generation Kevin McClatchy as chairman of the Board of Directors.

In February 2019, Forman emailed all staff to say about 10 percent of the newspaper chain's employees would be offered voluntary buyouts.

On February 13, 2020, The McClatchy Company and 54 affiliated companies filed for Chapter 11 bankruptcy protection in the United States District Court for the Southern District of New York. The company cited pension obligations and excessive debt as the primary reasons for the filing. In August 2020, the Court approved an offer by Chatham Asset Management—a hedge fund that also owns a 66% share in Canadian publisher Postmedia—to acquire McClatchy for $312 million. The company stated that it would not impose any layoffs, and would honor all current union agreements.

Company infrastructure
As of 2015, McClatchy had approximately 5,600 full and part-time employees. The company has two classes of stock, allowing the founding McClatchy family to retain control. In the Knight Ridder purchase, for example, McClatchy shareholders did not need to act in approving the purchase because the family had already voted their shares in favor.

Editor & Publisher reported in October 2006 that McClatchy's revenue ending August 2006 was down over one percent from August 2005. Between the announced purchase of Knight Ridder in March 2006 and late 2009, the stock value of McClatchy (MNI) declined significantly. On December 18, 2008, McClatchy common stock fell below $1 per share. The market capitalization of the company fell below $100 million, down over 98% since the purchase of Knight Ridder in early 2006. In 2010–2011, the stock had recovered off of its low, but was still down over 90% from the peak.

In 2016, McClatchy approved a 1 for 10 reverse stock split that boosted the price of its shares to over $11.

McClatchy has an Internet subsidiary, McClatchy Interactive (formerly known as Nando Media), which provides business support and material for Internet media (part of the News & Observer purchase). Other operations include Newsprint Ventures Inc., a consortium that operates the Ponderay newsprint mill near Spokane, Washington.

McClatchy also inherited a partnership with the Tribune Company in the news service Knight Ridder-Tribune Information Services, now McClatchy-Tribune Information Services (MCT), when it acquired Knight Ridder. In 2014, Tribune bought out McClatchy's share of the company and its headquarters moved to Chicago.

McClatchy DC Bureau
McClatchyDC is a news agency that distributes original reporting from McClatchy's Washington, D.C. bureau, which was acquired from Knight Ridder. It is the largest client of the McClatchy-Tribune Information Services.

In 2008, McClatchy's bureau chief in D.C., John Walcott, was the first recipient of the I. F. Stone Medal for Journalistic Independence, awarded by the Nieman Foundation for Journalism. In accepting the award, Walcott commented on McClatchy's reporting during the period preceding the Iraq War: "Why, in a nutshell, was our reporting different from so much other reporting? One important reason was that we sought out the dissidents, and we listened to them, instead of serving as stenographers to high-ranking [Bush administration] officials and Iraqi exiles."

McClatchy journalists have also won nine Pulitzer prizes in their 159-year history, most recently in 2017 for an article on the Panama Papers. They were also finalists in 2015 for articles on government efforts to hide Bush-era CIA torture.

Criticism
On August 4, 2013, McClatchy Newspapers, citing anonymous sources, reported on conversations between Ayman al-Zawahiri, who succeeded Osama bin Laden as the head of Al Qaeda, and Nasser al-Wuhayshi, the head of the Yemen-based Al Qaeda in the Arabian Peninsula, discussing an alleged imminent terrorist attack. Two days previously, The New York Times had agreed to withhold the identities of the Al Qaeda leaders after US intelligence officials claimed the information could jeopardize their operations. Government analysts and officials interviewed by the Times said the impact of this disclosure caused more immediate damage to American counter-terrorism efforts than the thousands of classified documents disclosed by Edward Snowden; after the McClatchy publication, there was a sharp drop in the terrorists' use of a major communications channel that the authorities were monitoring. Subsequently, officials have been searching for new ways to monitor communications among Al Qaeda's leaders and operatives.

Dailies
Note: (*)—Indicates newspaper acquired in 2006 Knight Ridder purchase.

The Beaufort Gazette (Beaufort, South Carolina)
Belleville News-Democrat (Belleville, Illinois)*
The Bellingham Herald (Bellingham, Washington)*
The Bradenton Herald (Bradenton, Florida)*
Centre Daily Times (State College, Pennsylvania)*
The Charlotte Observer (Charlotte, North Carolina)*
Ledger-Enquirer (Columbus, Georgia)*
The Fresno Bee (Fresno, California)
The Herald (Rock Hill, South Carolina)
The Herald-Sun (Durham, North Carolina)
The Idaho Statesman (Boise, Idaho)*
The Island Packet (Hilton Head, South Carolina)
The Kansas City Star (Kansas City, Missouri)*
Lexington Herald-Leader (Lexington, Kentucky)*
Merced Sun-Star (Merced, California)
Miami Herald (Miami, Florida)*
El Nuevo Herald (Miami, Florida)*
The Modesto Bee (Modesto, California)
The News & Observer (Raleigh, North Carolina)
The Olathe News (Olathe, Kansas)*
The Olympian (Olympia, Washington)*
The Sacramento Bee (Sacramento, California)
Fort Worth Star-Telegram (Fort Worth, Texas)*
The State (Columbia, South Carolina)*
Sun Herald (Biloxi, Mississippi)*
Sun News (Myrtle Beach, South Carolina)*
The News Tribune (Tacoma, Washington)*
The Telegraph (Macon) (Macon, Georgia)*
The San Luis Obispo Tribune (San Luis Obispo, California)*
The Wichita Eagle (Wichita, Kansas)
Tri-City Herald (Kennewick, Washington)

Dailies acquired in Knight Ridder purchase, then sold

 Aberdeen American News (Aberdeen, South Dakota)(Completed June 27, 2006)
 Akron Beacon Journal (Akron, Ohio)(Completed Aug. 2, 2006)
 Contra Costa Times (Walnut Creek, California)(Completed Aug. 2, 2006)
 Duluth News Tribune (Duluth, Minnesota)(Completed June 27, 2006)
 Fort Wayne News-Sentinel (Fort Wayne, Indiana)(Completed June 27, 2006)
 Grand Forks Herald (Grand Forks, North Dakota)(Completed June 27, 2006)
 The Herald (Monterey, California)(Completed Aug. 2, 2006)
 Philadelphia Daily News (Philadelphia, Pennsylvania)(Completed June 29, 2006)
 The Philadelphia Inquirer (Philadelphia, Pennsylvania)(Completed June 29, 2006)
 St. Paul Pioneer Press (St. Paul, Minnesota)(Completed Aug. 2, 2006)
 San Jose Mercury News (San Jose, California)(Completed Aug. 2, 2006)
 Times Leader (Wilkes-Barre, Pennsylvania)(Completed Aug. 2, 2006)

See also 
 
 
 
 Seattle Times – McClatchy owns 49.5% stake, with the Blethen family controlling the other 50.5%

References

External links
 

 
 Ipsos / The McClatchy Company Polls
 McClatchy Washington Bureau
 
 McClatchy Advertising - WinWithMcClatchy.com
 McClatchy Ad Manager - Self-Service Advertising

 
American companies established in 1857
Newspaper companies of the United States
Companies based in Sacramento, California
Mass media in Sacramento County, California
Publishing companies established in 1857
1857 establishments in California
Companies formerly listed on NYSE American
Pulitzer Prize for Explanatory Journalism winners
Companies that filed for Chapter 11 bankruptcy in 2020